The Philharmonisches Staatsorchester Hamburg (Hamburg Philharmonic State Orchestra) is an internationally renowned symphony orchestra based in Hamburg.  As of 2015, Kent Nagano has been General Music Director (Generalmusikdirektor) and chief conductor (Chefdirigent).  The Philharmoniker Hamburg also serves as the orchestra of the Hamburg State Opera.  The Hamburg Philharmonic is one of three major orchestras in Hamburg, the others being the Hamburger Symphoniker and the NDR Elbphilharmonie Orchestra.

History 
The forerunner organization, die Philharmonische Gesellschaft (The Philharmonic Society), was founded on November 9, 1828, and was led by Friedrich Wilhelm Grund.

In 1934 it merged with the Stadttheater-Orchester to become the Philharmonisches Staatsorchester Hamburg (the name under which it recorded a celebrated Eighth Symphony of Anton Bruckner under Eugen Jochum in 1949). The present name was adopted in 2005.

Chief conductors
 Die Philharmonische Gesellschaft (1828)
 1828–1862: Friedrich Wilhelm Grund
 1867–1895: Julius von Bernuth (de) (1830–1902)

 Vereins Hamburgischer Musikfreunde (1896)
 1908–1921: José Eibenschütz (no)
 1904–1922: Max Fiedler
 1922–1933: Karl Muck

 Philharmonisches Staatsorchester Hamburg (1934)
 1934–1949: Eugen Jochum
 1951–1959: Joseph Keilberth, Artistic Director
 1961–1973: Wolfgang Sawallisch
 1973–1976: Horst Stein
 1976–1982: Aldo Ceccato
 1984–1988: Hans Zender, GMD
 1988–1997: Gerd Albrecht, GMD
 1997–2005: Ingo Metzmacher, GMD
 2005–2015: Simone Young, GMD
 2015–current: Kent Nagano, GMD

References

External links

 

Culture in Hamburg
German symphony orchestras
Musical groups from Hamburg
1828 establishments in Germany
Musical groups established in the 1820s